Sir Frank Wakefield Holmes  (8 September 1924 – 23 October 2011) was a New Zealand economist and government advisor. He was appointed a Knight Bachelor in the 1975 Queen's Birthday Honours, for public services. He was an economics professor at Victoria University of Wellington, where he remained Emeritus Professor of the Institute of Policy Studies up until his death.

Holmes died on 23 October 2011, aged 87.

References 

1924 births
2011 deaths
New Zealand economists
New Zealand public servants
New Zealand Knights Bachelor
New Zealand military personnel of World War II
Academic staff of the Victoria University of Wellington
People from Oamaru
New Zealand justices of the peace